Ostmecklenburgische Flugzeugbau GmbH, (East Mecklenburg Aircraft Works Limited) was a light aircraft manufacturer in Neubrandenburg Mecklenburg-Western Pomerania. The company was commonly known as OMF Aircraft.

OMF was formed by Mathias Stinnes in 1998 and ceased operations in December 2003.

Stinnes formed OMF Aircraft to produce a certified version of the Stoddard-Hamilton Glastar designated the OMF-100-160 Symphony with certification achieved in 2001.

Realizing that the bulk of the market for this aircraft was in North America, Stinnes set up a production facility in Trois-Rivières, Quebec, Canada with financial help from the Government of Quebec. The plant building was constructed by the Town of Trois-Rivieres and leased to OMF. The plant was opened in September 2003.

OMF suffered from under-financing during its start-up phase and declared bankruptcy in December 2003, having produced 40 aircraft.

Production of the aircraft, under the designation Symphony SA-160, was resumed in 2005 by the former Canadian subsidiary operating under new ownership as Symphony Aircraft Industries.

Aircraft by date

 OMF-100-160 Symphony (2001)

References

External links
OMF Website on Archive.org

Defunct aircraft manufacturers of Germany